Paula Graciela Daza Narbona (born 25 January 1960) is a Chilean surgeon, pediatrician and politician who served as Undersecretary of Public Health. Daza was a consultant for Evelyn Matthei and Andrés Allamand during the 2013 Chilean general election partly drafting the health care plan of their presidential campaigns. During the COVID-19 pandemic a criminal complaint was filed against Daza and other members of the government, which accused them of negligence during the pandemic. Daza is responsible for implementing one of the most drastic vaccine passports during the COVID-19 pandemic in Chile.

In 2021, she left the government to support José Antonio Kast's candidacy in the 2021 Chilean general election ballotage.

In 2022 she was incorporated to the University for Development.

Notes

References 

Living people
1960 births
University of Chile alumni
University of the Andes, Chile alumni
Technion – Israel Institute of Technology alumni
Chilean pediatricians
Chilean surgeons
Academic staff of Diego Portales University